Machilus kurzii is a species of flowering plant in the laurel family (Lauraceae). It is native to mainland tropical Asia.

Description
Machilus kurzii is a small to medium-sized tree, growing 8 to 15 meters tall.

Range and habitat
Machilus kurzii ranges from the Eastern Himalayas in the west through northern Indochina and southern China (Yunnan province).

It is native to montane evergreen broadleaf forests and secondary growth, sometimes over limestone, between 800 and 2,000 meters elevation.

Human use
In Laos, the bark of Machilus kurzii, known as bong tree or yangbong, is harvested for gum and aromatic oils which are used to make incense sticks. Bong tree bark from wild trees has been over-harvested from wild trees, and wild tree populations have declined significantly. Since the early 2000s Laotians have been establishing hillside commercial bong tree plantations.

References

kurzii
Flora of East Himalaya
Flora of Indo-China
Flora of Yunnan
Incense material